Helen Maria Hallett Carr (born 1988) is a writer and historian of Medieval England.

Education 

Helen has an undergraduate degree in History of Art from the University of York, graduating in 2010 and a Research Master's degree in Medieval History from the University of Reading graduating in 2014.
She is currently working on a PhD at Queen Mary University London under the supervision of Professor Miri Rubin.

Career

Presenter / Producer 

Helen has presented several documentaries for HistoryHit TV including; Captain Cook's Endeavour and The Trail of Guy Fawkes.

Helen has appeared as an expert on Richard II as part of the Medieval Kings series and presented a documentary for Cambridge University on its history, shared globally.

She has produced history documentaries for BBC4, BBC2, SkyArts, Discovery, CNN and HistoryHit TV and has worked on BBC Radio 4’s In Our Time.

Helen is a regular features writer for BBC History Magazine and History Extra. She has also contributed to the New Statesman and History Today.

Between 2019 and 2021 Helen produced and presented the podcast Hidden Histories.

Helen covered the death and funeral of Queen Elizabeth II for Sky News Australia and City News TV Canada in September 2022

Author 
In April 2021 Helen published her first book, The Red Prince: John of Gaunt Duke of Lancaster, (Oneworld, 2021) 
This title was featured as a Times and Sunday Times best book of 2021 and became a Times best-seller in March 2022.

The Red Prince: John of Gaunt Duke of Lancaster was shortlisted for the prestigious 2022 Elizabeth Longford Prize for Historical Biography in May 2022.

Helen is the co-author and editor of What is History, Now? (W&N) alongside Professor Suzannah Lipscomb. This book, published in September 2021 by Weidenfeld & Nicolson was a follow up to What is History? (1961) the seminal work by her great-grandfather, the historian and diplomat, E.H Carr.

 ‘Helen Carr is one of the most exciting and talented young historians out there. She has a passion for medieval history which is infectious and is always energetic and engaging, whether on the printed page or the screen.’ — Dan Snow

Helen's next book, This England, will be published by Hutchinson Heinemann (Penguin Random House) in 2024.

In July 2022 Helen was elected a fellow of the Royal Historical Society

External links

References

British women historians
1988 births
Living people
British women television presenters
Historians of England
21st-century British women writers
Fellows of the Royal Historical Society
British women podcasters
British medievalists
Academics of Queen Mary University of London
Women medievalists